The 19th Alabama Infantry Regiment was an infantry regiment that served in the Confederate States Army during the American Civil War.

Service
The 19th Alabama Infantry Regiment was formed in Huntsville, Alabama, on August 14, 1861. The unit fought its first battle at the Battle of Shiloh on April 6 and 7, 1862. The Army of Tennessee fought most of its battles with the 19th engaged. The regiment surrendered at Salisbury, North Carolina, at the end of the war.

Total strength and casualties

Commanders
 Colonel Joseph Wheeler
 Colonel Samuel King McSpadden

See also
Alabama Civil War Confederate Units
Alabama in the American Civil War

Notes

References

Units and formations of the Confederate States Army from Alabama
1861 establishments in Alabama
Military units and formations established in 1861